You Are Here may refer to:

Music 
 You Are Here (Opshop album), 2004
 You Are Here (South (British band) album), 2008
 You Are Here (Thenewno2 album)
 You Are Here (UFO album), 2004
 You Are Here (+/- album)
 You Are Here (Banco de Gaia album), 2004
 You Are Here, an album by Atomic Hooligan, or the title song
 You Are Here, an album by Silver Sun
 "You Are Here" (song), a song by John Lennon from Mind Games
 "You Are Here", a song by Needtobreathe from Daylight

Film and television 
 You Are Here (1998 film), a screwball comedy starring Robert Knepper
 You Are Here (1998 TV film), a British television comedy short with music by Jonathan Whitehead
 You Are Here (2007 film), a romantic comedy starring Bijou Phillips
 You Are Here, also known as Are You Here, a 2013 American comedy-drama film directed by Matthew Weiner
 You Are Here (2010 film), a fantasy/science-fiction drama directed by Daniel Cockburn
 You Are Here (2018 film), a documentary film directed by Moze Mossanen
 You Are Here, a programming block on the U.S. Cartoon Network
 "You Are Here" (Charlie Jade), an episode of the television series Charlie Jade

Other uses 
 "You are here", a point indicated on a map to show the onlooker their exact location in an area and in which direction they need to travel to reach a certain place
 You Are Here, a graphic novel by Kyle Baker
 You Are Here (sculpture), an outdoor 2012 bronze sculpture by American artist Ron Baron

See also
 Earth's location in the universe